Bucheon Stadium is a multi-purpose stadium in Bucheon, Gyeonggi-do, South Korea.

It is currently used mostly for football matches and has been the home stadium of Bucheon FC 1995 since 2008. The stadium has a seating capacity for 34,456 spectators and was opened in 2001.

External links
 Bucheon FC 1995 Official website 
 Bucheon City website 

Football venues in South Korea
Multi-purpose stadiums in South Korea
Sports venues in Gyeonggi Province
Jeju United FC
Bucheon FC 1995
Buildings and structures in Bucheon
Sports venues completed in 2001
2001 establishments in South Korea
K League 1 stadiums
K League 2 stadiums